André Laignel (born 4 December 1942 in Paris) is a French politician.

Notes and references 

1942 births
Living people
Politicians from Paris
Convention of Republican Institutions politicians
Deputies of the 7th National Assembly of the French Fifth Republic
Deputies of the 8th National Assembly of the French Fifth Republic
Deputies of the 9th National Assembly of the French Fifth Republic
MEPs for Massif-central–Centre 2004–2009
Socialist Party (France) MEPs